Wing River Township is a township in Wadena County, Minnesota, United States. The population was 430 at the 2000 census.  It is named for the Wing River, which joins the Leaf River in the township.

Geography
According to the United States Census Bureau, the township has a total area of 36.0 square miles (93.3 km); 36.0 square miles (93.3 km) of it is land and 0.04 square miles (0.1 km) of it (0.06%) is water.  One property within the township, the 1792 site of Réaume's Trading Post, is listed on the National Register of Historic Places.

Demographics
As of the census of 2000, there were 430 people, 166 households, and 122 families residing in the township.  The population density was 11.9 people per square mile (4.6/km).  There were 196 housing units at an average density of 5.4/sq mi (2.1/km).  The racial makeup of the township was 98.84% White, 0.23% African American, 0.23% Native American, 0.70% from other races. Hispanic or Latino of any race were 0.70% of the population.

There were 166 households, out of which 30.1% had children under the age of 18 living with them, 66.9% were married couples living together, 4.2% had a female householder with no husband present, and 26.5% were non-families. 22.3% of all households were made up of individuals, and 10.2% had someone living alone who was 65 years of age or older.  The average household size was 2.59 and the average family size was 3.05.

In the township the population was spread out, with 25.1% under the age of 18, 8.1% from 18 to 24, 21.4% from 25 to 44, 29.5% from 45 to 64, and 15.8% who were 65 years of age or older.  The median age was 42 years. For every 100 females, there were 102.8 males.  For every 100 females age 18 and over, there were 109.1 males.

The median income for a household in the township was $35,469, and the median income for a family was $39,063. Males had a median income of $29,375 versus $26,250 for females. The per capita income for the township was $13,634.  About 3.7% of families and 7.3% of the population were below the poverty line, including 9.9% of those under age 18 and 5.5% of those age 65 or over.

References

Townships in Wadena County, Minnesota
Townships in Minnesota